In chess, a trap is a move which tempts the opponent to play a losing move. Traps are common in all phases of the game; in the opening, some traps have occurred often enough that they have acquired names.

List of chess traps 
Ordered by chess opening:

Albin Countergambit: Lasker Trap
Blackmar–Diemer Gambit: Halosar Trap
Bogo-Indian Defence: Monticelli Trap
Budapest Gambit: Kieninger Trap
Englund Gambit Trap
Italian Game: Blackburne Shilling Gambit
Petrov's Defence: Marshall Trap
Philidor Defence: Légal Trap
Queen's Gambit Declined: 
Elephant Trap
Rubinstein Trap
Ruy Lopez: 
Mortimer Trap
Noah's Ark Trap
Tarrasch Trap 
Fishing Pole Trap
Sicilian Defence: 
Magnus Smith Trap
Siberian Trap
Vienna Gambit: Würzburger Trap

See also
 Fool's mate
 Scholar's mate
 Swindle (chess)

Trap